Gardiner Parish is a civil parish of Gregory County in New South Wales.

The parish is on the Macquarie Marshes Nature Reserve.

References

Parishes of Australia
Parishes of New South Wales